Tricuspid regurgitation (TR), also called tricuspid insufficiency, is a type of valvular heart disease in which the tricuspid valve of the heart, located between the right atrium and right ventricle, does not close completely when the right ventricle contracts (systole). TR allows the blood to flow backwards from the right ventricle to the right atrium, which increases the volume and pressure of the blood both in the right atrium and the right ventricle, which may increase central venous volume and pressure if the backward flow is sufficiently severe.

The causes of TR are divided into hereditary and acquired; and also primary and secondary. Primary TR refers to a defect solely in the tricuspid valve, such as infective endocarditis; secondary TR refers to a defect in the valve as a consequence of some other pathology, such as left ventricular failure or pulmonary hypertension.

The mechanism of TR is either a dilatation of the base (annulus) of the valve due to right ventricular dilatation, which results in the three leaflets being too far apart to reach one another; or an abnormality of one or more of the three leaflets.

Signs and symptoms
The symptoms of TR depend on its severity. Severe TR causes right-sided heart failure, with the development of ascites and peripheral edema.

A pansystolic heart murmur may be heard on auscultation of the chest. The murmur is usually of low frequency and best heard on the lower left sternal border. It increases with inspiration, and decreases with expiration: this is known as Carvallo's sign. However, the murmur may be inaudible due to the  relatively low pressures in the right side of the heart. A third heart sound may also be present, also heard at the lower sternal border, and increasing in intensity with inspiration.

On examination of the neck, there may be giant C-V waves in the jugular pulse. With severe TR, there may be an enlarged liver detected on palpation of the right upper quadrant of the abdomen; the liver may be pulsatile on palpation and even on inspection.

Causes
The causes of TR may be classified as  congenital or acquired; another classification divides the causes into primary or secondary. Congenital abnormalities are much less common than acquired. The most common acquired TR is due to right ventricular dilatation. Such dilatation is most often due left heart failure or pulmonary hypertension. Other causes of right ventricular dilatation include right ventricular infarction, inferior myocardial infarction, and cor pulmonale.

In regards to primary and secondary causes they are:

Mechanism
In terms of the mechanism of tricuspid insufficiency, it involves the expansion of the tricuspid annulus (fibrous rings of heart). Tricuspid insufficiency is linked to geometric changes of the tricuspid annulus (decreased tricuspid annular release). The leaflets shape are normal but prevented from normal working mechanism due to a distortion of spatial relationships of leaflets and chords. It is also contemplated that the process via which tricuspid regurgitation emerges, is a decrease of contraction of the myocardium around the annulus.

Diagnosis
The diagnosis of TR may be suspected if the typical murmur of TR is heard. Severe TR may be suspected if right ventricular enlargement is seen on chest x-ray, and other causes of this enlargement are ruled out.

Definitive diagnosis is made by echocardiogram, which is capable of measuring both the presence and the severity of the TR, as well as right ventricular dimensions and systolic pressures.

Management

Medical

Medical therapy of Tricuspid regurgitation consists of diuretics, but as the disease progresses, they become inefficient.

Surgical

Indications for surgical fixation of tricuspidal issues include organic lesion(s) in the valve or severe functional regurgitation. During open heart surgery for another issue (e.g. mitral valve), fixing the tricuspid valve may be considered, but medical consensus is unclear. Some argue that even mild to moderate tricuspid regurgitation should be addressed, while others take a more conservative approach. Infective endocarditis or traumatic lesions are other indications.

Surgical options include annuloplasty or replacement of the valve. Adding a rigid prosthetic ring aims to decrease the diameter of the valve and stabilize it. Another annuloplasty modality is the "De Vega technique", in which the valve diameter is decreased by two sutures placed around the periphery of the valve. In cases of severe organic lesions of the valve, such as endocarditis, the valve may be excised. Tricuspid valve replacement with either a mechanical valve or a bioprosthesis may be indicated depending on the patient. Mechanical prostheses can cause thromboembolic phenomena, while bioprostheses may degenerate with use. Some evidence suggests that there is no significant difference between the survival rates of recipients of mechanical versus biological tricuspid valves.

When controlled for severity of TR, tricuspid valve surgery performed on TR patients as considered appropriate is associated with improved outcomes (Hazard ratio= .74).

Prognosis
The prognosis of TR is less favorable for males than females. Survival rates are proportional to TR severity; but even mild TR reduces survival compared to those with no TR. If the TR is due to left heart failure or pulmonary hypertension, prognosis is usually dictated by these conditions, not the TR.

Epidemiology 
Tricuspid regurgitation is common and is estimated to occur in 65–85% of the population. In The Framingham Heart Study presence of any severity of tricuspid regurgitation, ranging from trace to above moderate was in 82% of men and in 85.7% of women. Mild tricuspid regurgitation tend to be common and benign and in structurally normal tricuspid valve apparatus can be considered a normal variant. Moderate or severe tricuspid regurgitation is usually associated with tricuspid valve leaflet abnormalities and/or possibly annular dilation and is usually pathologic which can lead to irreversible damage of cardiac muscle and worse outcomes due to chronic prolonged right ventricular volume overload.

In a study of 595 male elite football players aged 18–38, and 47 sedentary non-athletes, it was found that 58% of the athletes had tricuspid regurgitation vs. 36% in non-athletes. Football players with tricuspid regurgitation had larger tricuspid annulus diameter, compared to athletes without tricuspid regurgitation. Athletes with tricuspid regurgitation also had enlarged right atrium diameter when compared to control group.

See also
 Heart valves

References

Sources

Further reading

External links 

Chronic rheumatic heart diseases
Valvular heart disease